Thylactus lateralis is a species of beetle in the family Cerambycidae. It was described by Karl Jordan in 1894. It is known from Sumatra and Borneo.

References

Xylorhizini
Beetles described in 1894